Plush Funk is the third installment of the George Clinton Family Series collection. The album was released in 1993 by P-Vine Records in Japan, and then was released the next year by AEM Records in the United States and Sequel Records in the United Kingdom. The CD features the track "May Day (S.O.S)", which was an outtake from the Funkadelic album "The Electric Spanking of War Babies".

As with all of the Family Series CD's, the last track features George Clinton supplying background information of all of the songs featured on the CD.

Track Listing and Personnel

May Day (S.O.S)

Artist: Funkadelic (1981)  Producer: George Clinton, Garry Shider
Drums: Ty Lampkin
Bass: Rodney "Skeet" Curtis
Guitar: Gary Shider, Michael Hampton, Cordell Mosson
Keyboards: David Spradley
Vocals: Funkadelic, Brides, Parlet, TreyLewd

These Feets Are Made for Dancing (Foot Stranger)

Artist: Ron Dunbar (1982)  Producer: George Clinton, Ron Dunbar
Drums: Tyrone Lampkin
Bass: Cordell Mosson
Guitar: Garry Shider
Keyboards: Bernie Worrell, David Spradley
Horns: Horny Horns
Vocals: Ron Dunbar, Parliament, Brides, Parlet
  
Booty Body Ready for the Plush Funk

Artist: Sterling Silver Starship (1980)  Producer: George Clinton, Ron Dunbar
Drums & Bass: Donnie Sterling
Piano: David Spradley
Guitar: Tony Thomas, Rodney Crutcher
Vocals: Donnie Sterling, Ron Dunbar, Parlet, Brides

I Envy the Sunshine

Artist: Jessica Cleaves (1980)  Producer: George Clinton
Drums: Ty Lampkin
Bass: Cordell Mosson
Piano: David Spradley
Horns: Horny Horns, Brecker Brothers
Guitar: Brim & Blackbyrd McKnight
Vocals: Jessica Cleaves, Brandye (Telma Hopkins, Joyce Vincent)

Lickety Split

Artist: Horny Horns (1979)  
Producer: George Clinton, Bootsy Collins, Fred Wesley
Drums: Ty Lampkin
Bass: Bootsy Collins
Percussion: Larry Fratangelo
Clavinet: Bernie Worrell
Fender Rhodes, Sax: Maceo Parker
Guitar: Michael Hampton
Trombone: Fred Wesley
Trumpet: Rick Gardner, Richard "Kush" Griffith

Common Law Wife

Artist: Flo (1972)  Producer: George Clinton
Drums: Ty Lampkin
Bass: Cordell "Boogie" Mosson
Guitar: Gary Shider, Bootsy Collins
Keyboards: Bernie Worrell
Horns: Clayton "Chicken" Gunnells, Robert "Chopper" McCullough, Randy Wallace
(This track was also released in 2003 on the Parliament CD reissue Chocolate City (album) with George Clinton as the featured lead vocalist)

Super Spirit

Artist: Junie Morrison (1978)  Producer: George Clinton, Walter Morrison
Drums, Bass, Electric Piano, Acoustic Piano, Moog Synth: Walter "Junie" Morrison
Vocals: Junie Morrison

Love Don't Come Easy

Artist: Brides of Funkenstein (1980)  Producer: George Clinton, Ron Dunbar
Drums, Bass: Donnie Sterling
Guitar: Tony Thomas, Gordon Carlton
Keyboard: David Spradley
Percussion: Larry Fratangelo
Strings, Horns: David Van De Pitte
Vocals: Brides

I Can't Stand It

Artist: Tracey "Trey Lewd" Lewis's Flastic Brain Flam & Andrew Foxxe (1981)  
Producer: George Clinton, Garry Shider
Drums: Tony Davis
Bass: Stevie Pannall
Guitar: Andre "Foxxe" Williams
Keyboard: David Spradley
Background Vocals: Parliament, Funkadelic, Brides, TreyLewd, 
P.Funk All-Stars

The Monster Dance

Artist: Ron Ford  (1980)  Producer: Ron Ford
Drums: Kenny Colton
Bass: Jimmy Ali
Guitar: Jerome Ali
Keyboard: David Spradley
Background Vocals: Parlet, Brides, Parliament, Funkadelic

We're Just Funkers

Artist: Michael Hampton (1980)  Producer: George Clinton, Ron Dunbar
Drums, Bass: Donnie Sterling
Keyboard, Piano: David Spradley
Rhythm Guitar: Tony Thomas
Lead Guitar: Michael Hampton
  
Studio Memories (Interview)
George Clinton

George Clinton (funk musician) albums
1992 albums
P-Vine Records albums